Xinfeng West railway station is a railway station in Xinfeng County, Ganzhou, Jiangxi, China. It is an intermediate stop on the Ganzhou–Shenzhen high-speed railway. It opened with the line on 10 December 2021.

References

Railway stations in Jiangxi
Railway stations in China opened in 2021